The 1999 San Marino local elections were held on 13 June to elect the mayors and the councils of Chiesanuova, the City of San Marino and Domagnano, in San Marino. Overall turnout was 66.1%.

Electoral system
Voters elected the mayor (Italian: capitano di castello) and the municipal council (giunta di castello). The number of seats was determined by law: the city council of Chiesanuova was composed of eight members; the councils of the City of San Marino and Domagnano were composed of 10 members.

Candidates ran on lists led by a mayoral candidate. Voters elected a list and were allowed to give up to two preferential votes. Seats were allocated with the d'Hondt method if the winner had obtained at least 60% of the votes. Otherwise, six seats would have been allocated to the winning party (five seats in Chiesanuova) and the rest of the seats would have been allocated using the d'Hondt method to the rest of the parties. The winning list mayoral candidate was proclaimed mayor.

In the municipalities where only one list contested the election, the election was considered valid if the turnout was over 50% and the votes to the list were over 50% of the valid votes (votes to the list plus blank votes).

Results

Chiesanuova

City of San Marino

Domagnano

References

External links
 Election results
 Elections in San Marino

1999
San Marino
Local election